Alexandria Park Community School is a New South Wales government-controlled school for secondary and primary students located on Cadigal country at Park Road, a south Sydney inner suburb, New South Wales, Australia. The school is a public-funded, partially academically selective, comprehensive, co-educational day school.

In 2020, the school enrolled approximately 900 students, from Year K to Year 12. 18% of students identified as Indigenous Australians and 58% were from a language background other than English. Opportunity classes are delivered in Year 5 and Year 6, as well as a selective stream in Year 7 to Year 12 for academically gifted and talented students. The school is operated by the NSW government Department of Education in accordance with a curriculum developed by the New South Wales Education Standards Authority. The school principal is Diane Fetherston.

History 
The school was established in December 2001 upon the merger of Cleveland Street High School, which had been relocated in 1982, with Waterloo High School. In 2003, Redfern Public School, Waterloo Public School and Alexandria Public School were further merged into the school.

Programs and initiatives
The Cleveland Street High School was located on Cleveland Street in Surry Hills prior to its move to the current Alexandria Park School site in 1982. The Cleveland Street site became Cleveland Street Intensive English High School. In December 2001, Waterloo High School and Cleveland Street High School amalgamated to become Alexandria Park Community School. From 1 January 2003, the school expanded with the amalgamation of Redfern Public School, Waterloo Public School, Alexandria Public School into the new Community School.

Until 2017, the junior school was located at the Park Rd Campus, and the senior school was located at the Mitchell Rd Campus. In 2017 the senior school relocated into temporary buildings (pop-up school) at the Park Rd Campus, with the intention that the Mitchell Road Campus would be occupied by the Cleveland Street Intensive English High School, freeing up the Cleveland Street site for a new 14 storey high school.

In 2018, the junior school moved into the expanded pop-up school on Park Rd. The Cleveland Street Intensive English High School moved to the original Park Rd Campus, pending the rebuild of the Mitchell Rd campus, which completed in 2019. 

In 2020, Phase 1 of the redevelopment was completed, and Phase 2 is currently in progress. The High School and Primary School moved into the completed buildings to make way for the demolition of the temporary buildings. Phase 1 provides new permanent learning spaces and core facilities for 1,000 primary students and approximately 500 secondary students. It commenced operations from the beginning of Term 4 2020. Phase 2 of the redevelopment will expand to accommodate new permanent learning spaces for 850 secondary students, plus a multipurpose hall, gymnasium, multiple sports courts and outdoor play spaces. It is expected to be finished in early 2022. The overall masterplan will allow Alexandria Park Community School to cater for 1,000 primary students and up to 1,200 secondary students. Additional learning spaces as part of future Stage 2 works are subject to enrolment demand.

Former school principals
 Rick Turansky

Awards
In 2013, the School received a NSW Department of Education director general’s award for ‘Improving Student Learning Outcomes’.

Notable alumni
 Biwali Bayles - Sydney Kings

See also

 List of government schools in New South Wales
 List of selective high schools in New South Wales
 Education in Australia

References

External links
 

Public high schools in Sydney
Alexandria, New South Wales
Selective schools in New South Wales
Public primary schools in Sydney
2001 establishments in Australia
Educational institutions established in 2001